List of Guggenheim Fellowships awarded in 1989 have been awarded annually since 1925, by the John Simon Guggenheim Memorial Foundation to those "who have demonstrated exceptional capacity for productive scholarship or exceptional creative ability in the arts."

References

1989
1989 awards